Cass Lake-Bena Schools (CLBS, School District #115) is a school district headquartered in Cass Lake, Minnesota. The district is on the Leech Lake Indian Reservation.

Within Cass County it serves Cass Lake and Bena. It also serves portions of Beltrami and Hubbard counties.

History
In 2018 the superintendent, Rochelle Johnson, was a finalist for the cabinet of Governor of Minnesota Tim Walz.

Schools
 High School (grades 9–12)
 Nevin Duncan served as principal from August 1979 until 1980. He was accused of disproportionately putting punishment on Native American students. In July 1980 Duncan resigned with the board voting 5 to 1 to accept the resignation.  Parents planned to file a lawsuit over Duncan's rule, and did not drop the plans after his resignation.
 Middle School (grades 5–8)
 Elementary School (grades K-4)

References

External links
 Cass Lake-Bena Schools

School districts in Minnesota
Education in Cass County, Minnesota
Education in Beltrami County, Minnesota
Hubbard County, Minnesota